GNUstep Renaissance is a development framework that reads XML descriptions of graphical user interfaces from an application bundle and converts them into native widgets and connections at runtime under either GNUstep or Mac OS X.

GNUstep Renaissance was written by Nicola Pero as an alternative to the NIB and gorm files used by Interface Builder and Gorm, respectively. Unlike the aforementioned formats, Renaissance can generate interfaces that can be run without modification on either GNUstep or Mac OS X. It also uses a feature called AutoLayout, which means that localized strings do not have to be manually resized.

As of January 2006, GNUstep Renaissance is beta software. A graphical frontend to Renaissance does not yet exist. A stable release has not been made since 2008, though the downloadable binary has not been rebuilt and is still the previous version.

Example
A simple example of an interface specification:
<gsmarkup>
 <objects>
 <menu type="main">
 <menuItem title="Quit" action="terminate:" key="q"/>
 </menu>
 <window id="myWindow" title="Hello, World">
 <vbox>
 <label>Hello, World</label>
 <button title="OK" action="performClose:" target="#myWindow"/>
 </vbox>
 </window>
 </objects>
</gsmarkup>
Assuming this file is in the application bundle and named , it can be loaded with the following Objective-C code:
[NSBundle loadGSMarkupNamed:@"Sample" owner:self];

Software using Renaissance
 Zipper

See also

 Gorm - GNUstep Graphical Object Relationship Manager (also UI builder)
 Interface Builder - Mac OS X and former NextStep Graphical Object Relationship Manager and UI builder

References

External links
 GNUstep Renaissance home web site

NeXT
GNU Project software
GNUstep